The following is a list of recurring Saturday Night Live characters and sketches introduced between September 27, 1997, and May 9, 1998, the twenty-third season of SNL.

Leon Phelps, The Ladies Man
Tim Meadows portrayed Leon Phelps, aka "The Ladies Man", in this popular series of sketches. Debuted October 4, 1997. Phelps (who is stuck in a 1970s mentality, is obsessed with Delta Burke, and speaks with a lisp) hosts a television show (The Ladies Man) where he takes calls and delivers sexual advice. However, Phelps's advice is always outrageous, ridiculous, and generally inaccurate, often suggesting "the butt" no matter what the caller had asked. Every time a woman calls, Phelps says, "Ooooh! It's a lady!" Phelps is always seen with a glass of Courvoisier, a brand of fine Cognac. Another notable episode had Meadows ingesting an entire vial of Viagra to test its effects, when he suddenly realizes he goes overboard when he is aroused by a photo of Sally Jesse Raphael.

More than once he has confused a man with a woman and expressed horror and repulsion  afterwards.

The Ladies Man was one of two sketches that featured the real Monica Lewinsky when she appeared on the May 8, 1999 episode hosted by Cuba Gooding Jr.  In a sketch in the 1998-99 season premiere, Phelps pretended that he was President Clinton and relived three of Monica's scenes with the President and how the "Ladies Man" would have acted out those same scenes.

This sketch became one of a handful of SNL sketches to spawn its own feature film, titled The Ladies Man.

Appearances

Issues with Jeffrey Kaufman
A Jim Breuer sketch. Debuted October 18, 1997.

Mango

A Chris Kattan sketch. Debuted October 18, 1997.

Morning Latte
This sketch features Will Ferrell and Cheri Oteri playing two morning talk show hosts. Ferrell plays Tom Wilkins, a typical vapid and smiling male TV personality, and Oteri plays his scatterbrained female co-host, Cass Van Rye. The two are depicted as being extremely chipper, and tend to be overenthusiastic about each other's mundane life stories, and about their less-than-stellar guests. This is more than likely due to the large amounts of latte they consume during the course of a show.

The two begin the show by recounting recent events in their personal lives (in the same vein as shows like Live with Regis and Kelly, which SNL itself has parodied after Oteri and Ferrell left the show), which are almost certainly never as exciting as their reactions to them. Cass usually tells a story about herself and her husband Eli, in which she never fails to include the detail about her inability to conceive children. Tom then tells a story about a recent event involving him and his wife Gail. Cass almost immediately forgets the details of his story, prompting her to ask questions to which he has already stated the answers. There is also usually a producer off to the side who throws out random comments, which Cass inadvertently forgets over the course of the show. The producer eventually gets fed up with her absentmindedness and loses his temper, shouting obscenities (such as, "YOU STUPID BITCH!") at her. The two hosts become stunned at the reaction, until he informs them that he was "just kidding", to which they respond with incessant laughter.

They also have guests on the show, yet no matter how boring or insipid they are, the two remain extremely enthralled throughout the interview. Debuted October 25, 1997.

Southern Gals
An Ana Gasteyer and Cheri Oteri and Molly Shannon sketch. Debuted November 15, 1997.

Tiger Beat's Ultra Super Duper Dreamy Love Show
An Ana Gasteyer, Cheri Oteri and Molly Shannon sketch. Debuted January 15, 1998. It stars Sarah Michelle Gellar as Jessica, Cheri Oteri as Sarah Margaret Connolly, Molly Shannon as Sissy Germane Daphne and Ana Gasteyer as Gladys Stubbs. It's about four teens who gossip about celebrities.

Gunner Olsen
Played by Jim Breuer, Olsen recapped the night's news in the style of a lead singer in a heavy metal band. Debuted March 7, 1998.

The Céline Dion Show
The Celine Dion Show was a faux variety show in which Ana Gasteyer played the Grammy award-winning singer, who in the opening credits claims to be "the most beautiful and most loved singer in the world". The sketch was inspired by Dion's success in the wake of her number one Billboard Hot 100 hit "My Heart Will Go On" in 1998.

In the sketches, Celine would usually begin with a solo, adding exaggerated vocal gymnastics and runs to even the simplest of songs. Then, she would usually invite a musical guest to perform. However, soon into their performance, Celine would feel upstaged, and would start singing over top of them in a much louder voice, much to their displeasure. Debuted March 7, 1998.

The sketch attracted the attention of the real singer herself, who invited Gasteyer to perform the character in one of her concerts in 1998.

GoLords

A parody of Thunderbirds and Supercar. The segments were written by Andrew Steele.

Pretty Living
Ana Gasteyer played the host of a TV show called Pretty Living. Each episode featured Molly Shannon as Helen Madden, an exuberant self-proclaimed "Joyologist" whose trademark phrase was "I love, I love it!" while kicking her legs and crossing and uncrossing her legs repeatedly. Helen Madden also appeared in an earlier 1996 sketch called "Single and Loving it" with Cheri Oteri.  Debuted March 14, 1998.

Terrence Maddox, Nude Model
A Will Ferrell sketch. Debuted March 14, 1998.

References

Lists of recurring Saturday Night Live characters and sketches
Saturday Night Live in the 1990s
Saturday Night Live
Saturday Night Live